Misha is the mascot of the 1980 Olympic Games.

Misha may also refer to:

 Misha (name), a given name and nickname, including a list of people and characters
 Misha (Pita-ten), character from the anime and manga Pita-ten
 Misha (Mandaeism), holy anointing oil used in Mandaeism
 Misha (singer) (born 1975), Slovak R&B musician
 Misha (album), the second studio album by Misha
 Misha (woreda), Hadiya Zone, Ethiopia
 Misha, Yarkant County, Yarkant County, Kashgar Prefecture, Xinjiang, China (PRC)
 Misha: A Mémoire of the Holocaust Years, hoax Holocaust memoir

See also
 Mischa (disambiguation)
 Mishka (disambiguation)
 Myosha River, a river in Tatarstan, Russia